Goudet is a commune in the Haute-Loire department in south-central France. The village stands on the upper reaches of the river Loire and is overlooked by the Château de Beaufort, built in the 13th century, of importance during the Hundred Years War and the French Wars of Religion but abandoned after the Revolution of 1789.

The Robert Louis Stevenson Trail (GR 70), a popular long-distance path, runs through the village, as do the GR3 and GR40.

Population

See also
 Communes of the Haute-Loire department

References

Communes of Haute-Loire